Timothy or Tim Hutchinson may refer to:

Tim Hutchinson (Young Timothy Hutchinson, born 1949), former United States senator from Arkansas
Timothy Chad Hutchinson (born 1974), former member of the Arkansas House of Representatives and son of Tim Hutchinson
Tim Hutchinson (production designer) (born 1946), British art director
Tim Hely Hutchinson (born 1953), British publishing executive

See also
Tom Hutchinson (disambiguation)
Tom Hutchison (disambiguation)